Mark Louis Hallett (born 11 March 1965) is an English art historian specialising in the history of British art. He is the Director of the Paul Mellon Centre for Studies in British Art. He has recently been announced as the next Märit Rausing Director of the Courtauld Institute of Art, and is due to take up this post in April 2023.

Career 
Hallett, who grew up in mid-Wales, attended his local secondary School in Tregaron, Cardiganshire. He took his undergraduate degree at Cambridge University, graduating in 1986, and studied for a master's degree (1989) and a PhD (1996) at the Courtauld Institute of Art. He was an Andrew W. Mellon Fellow at Yale University in 1990–91. 

Having been appointed lecturer in 1994, he spent eighteen years teaching History of Art at the University of York, where he was made a professor in 2006. He was Head of the History of Art department at York between 2007 and 2012, and a member of the University's Centre for Eighteenth Century Studies.

Hallett was appointed Director of Studies at the Paul Mellon Centre in October 2012. In this role, he has overseen a major expansion of the Centre's premises, personnel, activities and remit. Under his leadership, the Centre has become known for supporting and publishing research on British art and architecture of all periods, having previously been distinguished by its primary focus on the art of the Georgian era. In this same period, the Centre has also become recognised for its pioneering forms of online publication, its transformative support of the British Art Network, its expanded learning and events programme, and its ambitious in-house research projects. During his time as Director, Hallett has also overseen the launch of a succession of new funding streams within the Centre's Grants and Fellowships programme. These have included two rounds of Research Continuity Grants, which were designed to sustain art-historical research during the Covid-19 pandemic, and the continuing New Narratives initiative, which is intended to support the development of a more diverse range of scholarly voices in the field of British art studies. 

As an art historian, Hallett is best known for his writings on eighteenth-century graphic satire, exhibition culture and portraiture, and for his books and catalogues on the artists William Hogarth and Joshua Reynolds. He also co-edited and contributed to the major online publication, The Royal Academy Summer Exhibition: A Chronicle, 1769–2018 (Paul Mellon Centre, 2018). More recently, he has been working on modern and contemporary British art, and has published on figures such as Michael Andrews and Frank Auerbach. He has also become involved in making films about different aspects of British art, and is currently working on a film project devoted to The Procession, by the contemporary artist Hew Locke.

Hallett has also been involved in curating numerous major exhibitions, including James Gillray: The Art of Caricature (Tate Britain, 2001); Joshua Reynolds: The Creation of Celebrity (Tate Britain, 2005); Hogarth (Tate Britain, 2007); William Etty: Art and Controversy (York Art Gallery, 2011); Joshua Reynolds: Experiments in Paint (Wallace Collection, 2015); The Great Spectacle: 250 Years of the Summer Exhibition (Royal Academy, 2018); and George Shaw: A Corner of a Foreign Field (Yale Center for British Art, 2018). In 2019, he co-curated the Tate Britain Spotlight Display Vital Fragments: Nigel Henderson and the Art of Collage.

Hallett has been a visiting scholar at the University of Cambridge and at the Courtauld Institute of Art. He gave the 2011 Watson Gordon lecture at the Scottish National Gallery and the 2019 Aspects of Art lecture at the British Academy. 

In 2021, he was appointed a member of the Reviewing Committee for the Export of Works of Art and Objects of Cultural Interest.

Publications

Books and catalogues 

 Frank Auerbach: Drawings of People (co-edited with Catherine Lampert), Paul Mellon Centre, 2022
 George Shaw: A Corner of a Foreign Field (ed.), Yale University Press, 2018
 The Great Spectacle: 250 Years of the Royal Academy Summer Exhibition (co-authored with Sarah Turner), Royal Academy Publishing, 2018
 Court, Country, City: Essays on British Art and Architecture, 1660–1735 (co-edited with Martin Myrone and Nigel Llewellyn), Yale University Press, 2016
 Joshua Reynolds: Experiments in Paint (edited with Lucy Davis), The Wallace Collection, 2015
 Reynolds: Portraiture in Action, Yale University Press, 2014
 Living with the Royal Academy: Artistic Ideals and Experiences in England, 1769-1848 (ed. with Sarah Monks and John Barrel)l, Ashgate, 2013
 Faces in a Library: ‘Sir Joshua Reynolds’s ‘Streatham Worthies’ (The Watson Gordon Lecture 2011), National Galleries of Scotland, 2012
 William Etty: Art and Controversy (ed. with Sarah Burnage and Laura Turner), Philip Wilson Publishers, 2011
 Hogarth (co-authored with Christine Riding), Tate Publishing, 2007
 Eighteenth Century York: Culture, Space and Society, ed. with Jane Rendall, Borthwick Institute, 2003
 Hogarth, Phaidon Press, 2000
 The Spectacle of Difference: Graphic Satire in the Age of Hogarth, Yale University Press, 1999

Online Publications 

 The Royal Academy Summer Exhibition: A Chronicle, 1769–2018 (co-editor) Paul Mellon Centre, 2018

Films and Recorded Lectures 
 The Original: William Hogarth's A Harlot's Progress (1732), made with Jon Law, Paul Mellon Centre, 2021
 The Sequel: William Hogarth's A Rake's Progress (1733-5), made with Jon Law, Paul Mellon Centre, 2021
 Making an Impact: Thomas Lawrence's Arthur Atherley (1792), Paul Mellon Centre, 2020
 Displaying the Hero: John Singleton Copley's The Death of Major Peirson (1784), Paul Mellon Centre, 2020
 Walking the Streets: William Hogarth’s The Four Times of Day (1736-8), Paul Mellon Centre, 2020
 Vital Fragments: Nigel Henderson and the Art of Collage, 12 short films made with Rosie Ram and Jon Law, Paul Mellon Centre, 2019

Articles and Essays 

 ‘The newspaper man: Michael Andrews and the art of painted collage’, The Journal of the British Academy, volume 8 (2020)
 ‘A Double Capacity: Gainsborough at the Summer Exhibition’, in Christoph Vogtherr (ed.), Thomas Gainsborough: The Modern Landscape, Hamburger Kunstalle, 2018
 ‘Cornucopia: Royal Female Portraiture and the Imperatives of Reproduction’ (co-authored with Cassandra Albinson), in Joanna Marschner (ed.), Enlightened Princesses: Caroline, Augusta, Charlotte, and the Shaping of the Modern World, Yale University Press, 2017
 ‘A monument to intimacy: Joshua Reynolds's The Marlborough Family', in Art History, Vol.31, no. 5, 2008
 'Reynolds, Celebrity and the Exhibition Space', and numerous catalogue entries, in Martin Postle (ed) Joshua Reynolds: The Creation of Celebrity, Tate Publishing, 2005
 Reading the Walls: Pictorial Dialogue at the British Royal Academy', in Eighteenth-Century Studies, vol. 37, no. 4 (2004)
 'From Out of the Shadows: Sir Joshua Reynolds' Captain Robert Orme', in Visual Culture in Britain, Vol. 5, No. 2, 2004
 'Manly Satire: William Hogarth's A Rake's Progress' in Bernadette Fort and Angela Rosenthal (eds.), The Other Hogarth: The Aesthetics of Difference, Princeton University Press, 2001.
 'James Gillray and the Language of Graphic Satire', in Richard Godfrey (ed.) Gillray and the Art of Caricature, Tate Gallery Publications, 2001.
 'The Business of Criticism: the Press and the Royal Academy Exhibition in Eighteenth-Century London' in David Solkin (ed.) Art on the line: the Royal Academy Exhibitions at Somerset House 1780-1836, Yale University Press, 2001.
 'The view across the City: William Hogarth and the visual culture of eighteenth-century London' in David Bindman, Frederic Ogee and Peter Wagner (eds.), Hogarth: Representing Nature's Machines, Manchester University Press, 2001.
 'Painting: Exhibitions, Audiences, Critics, 1780–1830', in An Oxford Companion to the Romantic Age: British Culture 1776-1832, edited by Iain McCalman, Oxford University Press, 1999
 'The Medley Print in Early Eighteenth-Century London', in Art History, Vol 20, no. 2, June 1997
 'Framing the Modern City: Canaletto's Images of London', in Michael Liversidge and Jane Farrington (eds.), Canaletto and England, Birmingham Museums and Art Gallery, 1993

References

 

 
 
 

 

 
 
 

English art historians
Living people
Alumni of Pembroke College, Cambridge
Alumni of the Courtauld Institute of Art
1965 births
Academics of the University of York
Yale University fellows